Franciscano San Román is a Peruvian football club, playing in the city of Juliaca, Peru.

History
Franciscano San Román is of the clubs with greater tradition in the city of Puno, Peru.

In the 2004 Copa Perú, the club classified to National Stage, but was eliminated by Senati of Arequipa.

The club was the 2002, 2003, 2004 and 2009 departamental champion and 2009 Liga Superior champion.

In the 2011 Copa Perú, the club classified to National Stage, but was eliminated by Sportivo Huracán of Arequipa.

Honours

Regional
Región VIII: 1
Winners (1): 2004
Runner-up (1): 2011

Región VII: 0
Runner-up (1): 2002, 2003

Liga Departamental de Puno: 5
Winners (5): 2002, 2003, 2004, 2009, 2011

Liga Superior de Puno: 1
Winners (1): 2009
 Runner-up (2): 2008, 2011

See also
List of football clubs in Peru
Peruvian football league system

External links
 Liga Superior de Puno 2010

Football clubs in Peru